Martin McKenna (21 February 1969 – September 2020) was a British artist and illustrator, known for his work in role-playing games, novels, and comics, mainly of horror and fantasy genres.

He illustrated many Games Workshop products in the 1980s, and his pen-and-ink drawings were a key part of the visual identity of the first edition of Warhammer Fantasy Roleplay. In addition to creating a large amount of art for Warhammer Fantasy Roleplay, he also provided drawings for many other Warhammer Fantasy Roleplay publications. When Games Workshop started its Warhammer fiction line in 1990, he was asked to provide all the internal art. In addition to Warhammer, he also contributed to Fighting Fantasy books, Everway,  Magic: The Gathering, video games (including Eidos Interactive, and film and television. He has illustrated books for numerous international publishers including Scholastic, Penguin Books, Oxford University Press, HarperCollins, Time-Warner, and Hodder & Stoughton, illustrating popular authors such as Anne McCaffrey, Raymond E. Feist and Harry Turtledove, as well as some classics including Dr Jekyll & Mr Hyde and The Silver Sword. He wrote books about digital art, such as Digital Fantasy Painting Workshop and Digital Horror Art. He produced the children’s picture books The Octopuppy and The Crocodolly.

Early life 
McKenna was born in London and started out in illustration with work for fantasy & horror small press magazines in 1985 at the age of 16. As a child, he was inspired by "the things [he] found most frightening," including the gothic horror episodes of Doctor Who and Hammer and Universal horror movies.

Education 
McKenna was entirely self-taught as an artist and for many years he used entirely traditional materials. In 1997, he transitioned mostly to digital work.

Personal life 
He married and had a son born in 2013. His hobbies included reading, watching films, training his border collie, Nell, for sheepdog trials, hiking Scottish mountains, and flying airplanes. He lived in Lincolnshire, United Kingdom from 2014 to 2020 before relocating to Scotland in July 2020.

Death 
McKenna committed suicide in September 2020. He was survived by his son.

Published work 
Many of McKenna's works are archived on Flickr.

Awards 
In 1995 he was awarded the British Fantasy Award for Best Artist.

References

1969 births
2020 deaths
2020 suicides
English illustrators
Role-playing game artists
Suicides in England
Artists from London
20th-century English artists
21st-century English artists
20th-century English male artists
21st-century English male artists